= Ayusai river falls =

Ayusai river
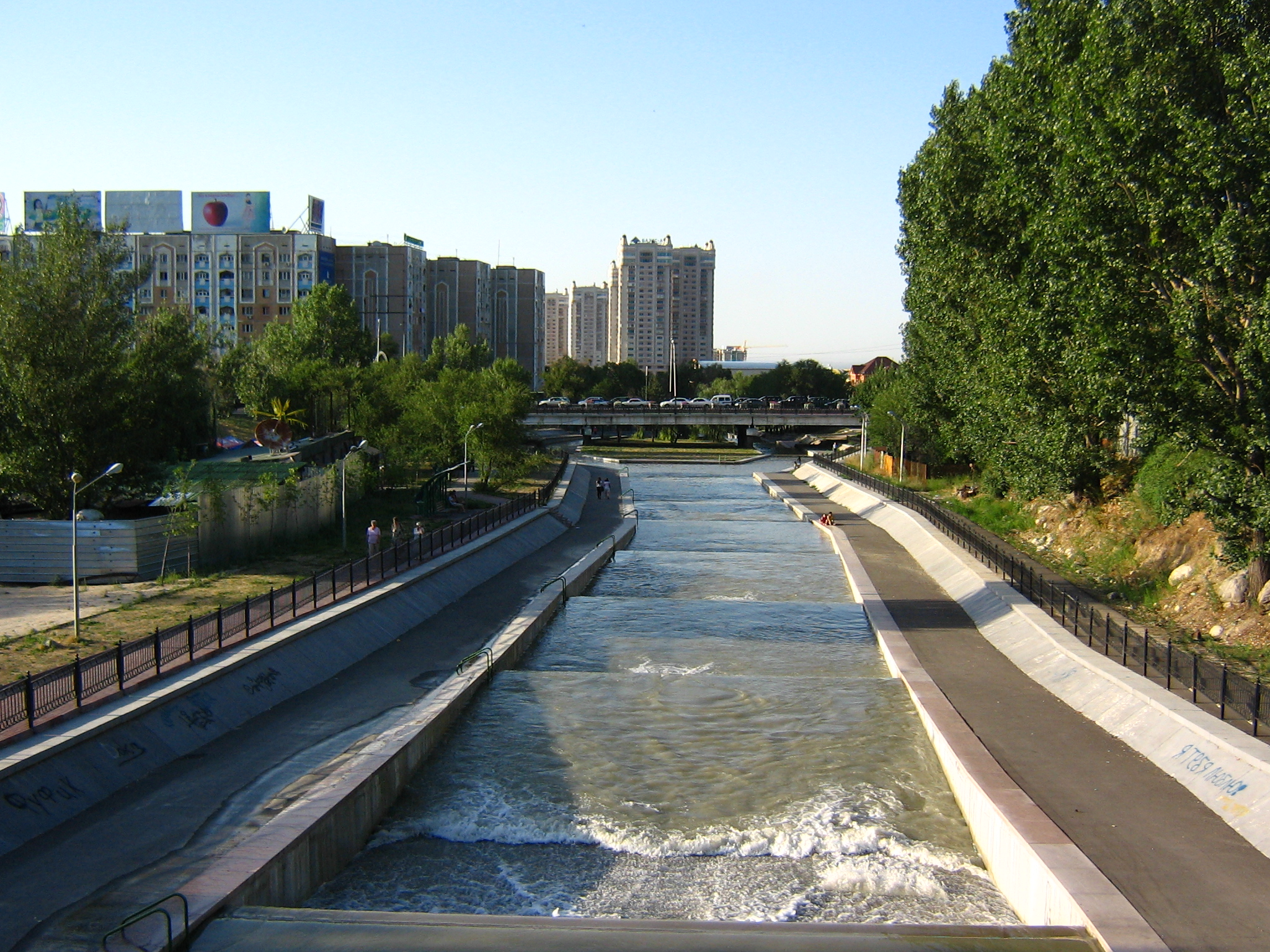
- Алматинка - panoramio (10)
- Location: Kazakhstan, Almaty Region
- Total height: 5 m (16 ft)

Ayusay gorge ("Bear gorge" in Russian) is a left branch from the Big Almaty gorge (BAU), about 6–7 km long, starting a little East of the top of the Big Almaty peak. The monument is located on the territory of the state national natural Park Ile-Alatau.

== Description ==
The Ayusay river enters the left tributary of the Big Almatinka, flows along granite ledges, forming cascades of falls of different heights. Three kilometers above the confluence of the Ozernaya and Almaty rivers is the mouth of the Ayusay river, which flows in a very narrow, deep and impassable gorge. The name of the gorge is translated as the Bear ravine. From the glade with the sculpture of bears to the first falls, the path deep into the gorge is only about 700 meters. Waterfall with a height of about 5–6 meters appears around the left turn. The second falls, almost immediately after the first, is low — 3 meters. Above the waterfall there is an observation platform. In June, there is snow in places-the remnants of spring avalanches. The third falls is hidden, on the left, behind a cliff in the background. In June, it can be crossed by a snow bridge. The third waterfall, the highest of the waterfalls of the Ayusai gorge, its height is 10 meters. To the right of the waterfall there is a spacious observation deck. The route through Ayusay can be either summer or winter. But in winter and spring there is a danger of avalanches. A trip to Ayusay will take 5–6 hours. This is at an average or even slow pace of movement. The maximum load is fixed on weekends, when the number of visitors reaches 1000–1200 people. This is mainly at the first waterfall. A much smaller number of tourists go up to the second and third levels.

In May 2021, the Akim (Mayor) of Almaty Bakytzhan Sagintayev announced the focus on increasing mudslide protection at the Ayusai Gorge.
